(ISPS, also known as ISPS Handa) is a Japanese non-profit organization known for its sponsorship of golf tournaments worldwide, including the PGA Seniors Championship and LPGA Women's Australian Open. ISPS Handa is a member of the Tokyo Sports Association, a public interest incorporated foundation.

ISPS founder Haruhisa Handa is known for promoting blind golf and introducing the sport to Japan. ISPS is involved in the campaign for disabled golf to be adopted as an official event of the Paralympics.

History 
 ISPS Handa was founded in 2006, establishing “Handa Cup” in US,  as well as the “Handa Australian Cup” in Australia to fund and support LPGA senior golf tournaments.  It also began organizing  amateur events such as the Handa Cup All-Japan Golf Tutors Pro-Am Open Championship.
 Since 2007, ISPS Handa has also supported bowling tournaments in Japan, and has co-sanctioned Handa Cup Japan Pro Bowling Championship and Handa Cup All Japan Women's Pro Bowling Championship.  It also began to establish and support tournaments for international major tours.
 Since 2010, ISPS Handa has been hosting championships in Japan such as: JPGA Senior Tour and JGTO Challenge Tournament, including the ISPS Handa Cup Senior Masters.
 In January 2012, ISPS Handa established the ISPS Handa PGA Academy Program in collaboration with the PGA European Tour, in which UK professional golfers provide instruction to blind golfers.
 In 2013, ISPS Handa organized World Sports Values Summit for Peace in Tokyo.
 In July 2014, ISPS Handa started supporting Mpumalanga Black Aces F.C. in the Republic of South Africa.
 In June 2015, ISPS Handa founded ISPS Handa Global Cup, its first hosting tournament in association with Japan Golf Tour Organization.

Golf 
ISPS Handa promotes disabled golf and blind golf,  and provides management and financial support to a number of tournaments in cooperation with the local golf associations worldwide.

There have been a number of tournaments organized entitled “ISPS”, the abbreviation of International Sports Promotion Society and “HANDA” which is the last name of Haruhisa Handa, the Chairman, as well as the combined title “ISPS HANDA”. ISPS Handa became the title sponsor for the 2013 Golf World Cup, resulting in the official title of the tournament as “ISPS Handa World Cup Golf”.

The 6th PGA Handa Cup Philanthropy Senior Tournament (organized by The Professional Golfers’ Association of Japan), had total prize money 5 times higher than the previous year's (2006 The 5th PGA Philanthropy Rebornest Senior Open), becoming the first “Total Prize Money 100,000,000 yen Tournament” in the history of the PGA Senior Tour. Since its 11th event in 2012, this Tournament has been organized by ISPS, and the 2014 event was entitled as the “ISPS Handa Cup Philanthropy Senior Tournament”.

The ISPS Handa Global Cup (Japan Golf Tour Organization) launched in June 2015, was broadcast overseas as a golf program with a commentator in English for the first time in the golf history of Japan.  Besides the TV broadcast, the program was also distributed online through Ustream. The winner received as a prize a Japanese green Haori, instead of the green jacket.

Current ISPS Handa events

Past ISPS Handa events

Summit 
ISPS co-sanctioned the World Sports Values Summit for Peace in Tokyo, which was held on 18–19 July 2013. Top athletes and researchers came together from 16 countries around the world to discuss the topic “Sports can contribute to harmonize the development of humanity and to establish and encourage a peaceful society”.

At the World Sports Values Summit for Peace and Development, held on 23–24 May 2014 at the United Nations Headquarters, New York City, a partnership between ISPS and the United Nations Alliance of Civilizations (UNAOC) was announced.

Japan bowling 

In Japan ISPS supports bowling, hosting national tournaments throughout the year. In Japan roughly 20% of the population bowls, compared with the 13.8% who play golf. However, the number of bowling alleys has decreased from 3,000 to 1,000. Through the support of the ISPS, a number of bowling events have been held and the professionalism of the sport has been advanced.

Organization 
Founder and Chairman
 Haruhisa Handa
Honorary Chairman
 George Carey
Director
 Shinichiro Kurimoto
Affiliation pro
Golfers

Hideto Tanihara
Yoshinori Fujimoto
Akihito Yokoyama
Miki Sakai
Satoshi Nakayama
Akira Kobayashi

Ambassadors

 Laura Davies
 Lydia Ko
 Kathy Whitworth
 Jan Stephenson
 Yoshinori Fujimoto
 Miki Sakai

See also
 International Blind Golf Association
 Japanese Blind Golf Association

References

External links 
 ISPS Golf

 
Organizations based in Tokyo
Golf in Japan
Ten-pin bowling in Japan
Parasports organizations
2006 establishments in Japan
Sports organizations established in 2006
Sports organizations of Japan